Invincible is the second studio album released by English boy band Five. The album was released in the United Kingdom by RCA Records on 8 November 1999, and was later released in the United States on 16 May 2000. Four singles were released from Invincible, including the UK chart-toppers "Keep on Movin'" and "We Will Rock You". The album was executively produced by Simon Cowell and Richard "Biff" Stannard. During their performance at Rock in Rio 2001, group member Scott Robinson stated that the title track "Invincible" was intended to be released as a single, but they decided against it as they were working on their third album.

The album reached number four on the UK Albums Chart, the lowest-charting original album by the band, although it went on to become their biggest seller in UK, being certified double platinum.

Background
The original version of the album, released in November 1999, contains a total of fifteen tracks, including the hidden track, "Inspector Gadget". It also contains the original album version of "We Will Rock You". A limited edition version of the standard album, containing an exclusive photo booklet, birthday calendar and free poster was also made available in certain countries in Europe. For the album's release stateside in May 2000, the track listing was revised, removing "Mr. Z", "Sunshine" and "Battlestar", remixing "Don't Wanna Let You Go", and adding the track "Don't Fight It Baby", originally contributed by the band for the soundtrack to the film Loser.

The Japanese edition of the album retains the original track listing, but includes the B-side recording "Reminiscing" as a bonus track, and an enhanced section, containing two videos. A special edition of the album was later released in November 2000, featuring a bonus disc, containing five tracks recorded at the Manchester Evening News Arena during the band's Invincible Tour on 26 March 2000. Disc one was also altered, replacing the original version of "We Will Rock You" with the single mix, adding "Don't Fight It Baby" and a remix of "Keep on Movin'" as bonus tracks, and including an enhanced section, containing four music videos.

Chart performance
The album reached number four on the UK Albums Chart, the lowest-charting original album by the band, although it went on to become their biggest seller, being certified double platinum. The album also peaked at number 108 on the US Billboard 200.

Track listing
All tracks are produced by Julian Gallagher and Richard Stannard except where noted.

Notes
 signifies an additional producer
 signifies a remixer
"If Ya Gettin' Down" includes a sample from "Last Night a D.J. Saved My Life", performed by Indeep
"Battlestar" includes a sample of "Battlestar Galactica", performed by John Williams and The Boston Pops Orchestra

Personnel

Five
Jason "J" Brown – vocals; Rhodes piano on track 13
Sean Conlon – vocals; piano on track 7
Richard Abidin "Abs" Breen – vocals; drums and programming on track 2
Ritchie Neville – vocals
Scott Robinson – vocals
Additional musicians
Mista Dexter – turntables on tracks 1, 2, 4, 8, 10, 11, 12 and 14
Filo – backing vocals on tracks 1, 2, 4, 7, 10, 11 and 13
John Themis – guitar on tracks 2, 7, 8 and 13
Steve Lewinson – bass on tracks 2, 7, 8 and 55
Steve McCutcheon – keyboards on track 2
Sharon Murphy – backing vocals on track 2
Brian May – guitar on track 4
Roger Taylor – drums on track 4
Andy Caine – backing vocals on track 4
Mikkel Storleer Eriksen – additional vocals on track 5
Mats Berntoft – guitar on track 9
Sead – turntables on track 9
Anders Von Hofsten – backing vocals on track 9
Andreas Carlsson – backing vocals on track 9
Snake Davis – flute on track 11
Maren Hernandez – additional vocals on track 15
Wayne Hector – backing vocals on track 15
Alistair Tennant – backing vocals on track 15
Jonathan Pearce – commentary on track 16

Production and additional personnel
Simon Cowell – executive production
Richard "Biff" Stannard – executive production; production on all tracks except 5, 6 and 9; mixing on track 10
Julian Gallagher– production on all tracks except 5, 6 and 9; mixing on track 10
Richard Norris – production on tracks 4, 12 and 14
Stargate – production on tracks 5 and 6; remix and additional production on track 3
Steve Mac – production, mixing and arrangements on track 15; additional production and additional mixing on tracks 2 and 16
Jake – production, recording, keyboards and programming on track 9
Per Magnusson – production, recording, keyboards and programming on track 9
Adrian Bushby – recording and mixing on all tracks except 5, 6, 9 and 10; mix engineering on track 10
Jake Davies – Pro Tools engineering on tracks 2, 3, 4, 7, 8, 12, 13, 14 and 55; mixing on tracks 2 and 16; additional arrangements on track 12
Matt Howe – mix engineering on tracks 2, 15 and 16
Chris Laws – engineering and programming on track 15; additional programming on track 16
Daniel Pursey – engineering assistance on track 2; mix engineering assistance on tracks 15 and 16
Justin Shirley-Smith – recording on track 4
Matt Sime – vocal recording on track 10
Alvin Sweeney – recording assistance on tracks 2, 3, 7, 8, 14 and 55; mixing assistance on track 16
Conal Markey – recording on track 10; recording assistance on tracks 1, 2 and 11; mixing assistance on track 16
Dave Morgan – recording assistance on tracks 7, 12 and 14
Pat McGovern – recording assistance on tracks 1 and 11
Steve McKeown – string arrangements on track 7
Paul West – art direction, graphic design
Paula Benson – art direction, graphic design
Valerie Phillips – photography

Charts

Weekly charts

Year-end charts

Certifications

Invincible Tour 

The Invincible Tour was a 2000 concert tour by Five in promotion of the album.

Background 
Along with the band's native UK, the tour went to Europe, Australasia and—as a foursome—South America, after member Ritchie Neville contracted chickenpox and had to be flown back to England in order to recover.

Concert synopsis

Set list 
This set list was played at the Manchester EN Arena on 26 March 2000.
 "Battlestar"
 "Shake"
 "Everybody Get Up"
 "When the Lights Go Out"
 "It's the Things You Do"
 "Got the Feelin'"
 "Until the Time Is Through"
 "Slam Dunk (Da Funk)"
 "If Ya Gettin' Down"
 "Serious"
 "Two Sides to Every Story"
 "Don't Wanna Let You Go"
 "Invincible"
 "Keep On Movin'"
 "We Will Rock You" (Encore)

Tour dates

References

1999 albums
Five (band) albums
Albums produced by Stargate
Albums produced by Richard Stannard (songwriter)

sv:Invincible (musikalbum)